is a Shinto shrine in the city of Yawata in Kyoto Prefecture, Japan.

History
The shrine's Heian period connections with the Kyoto and the Imperial family date from its founding in 859 (Jōgan 1) when construction on its earliest structures commenced.  Shrine tradition explains that Emperor Seiwa ordered the shrine to be built in obeisance to an oracle in which the god Hachiman expressed the desire to be near to Kyoto to watch over the city and the Imperial House of Japan.  This vision was reported by a Buddhist monk, Gyōkyō, who had a second vision which led to selecting the Otokoyama location where the shrine now stands. Like other Hachiman shrines, until 1868 Iwashimizu was actually a shrine-temple complex (jingū-ji) called  dedicated to Buddhism as much as to kami worship.

The shrine became the object of Imperial patronage during the early Heian period.  In 965, Emperor Murakami ordered that Imperial messengers were sent to report important events to the guardian kami of Japan. These heihaku were initially presented to 16 shrines including the Ōharano Shrine.

The shrine's importance and influence grew in succeeding centuries; and its extensive landholdings led to modest conflicts with Minamoto no Yoritomo during the years in which the Kamakura shogunate was establishing itself.  The shrine sought to maintain its traditional exemption from contributing to paying the costs of military forces.  In time, the bakufu faded away; and the shrine endured.

 1456 (Kōshō 2, 3rd month): Ashikaga Yoshimasa visited Iwashimizu Shrine; and all the officials of the Daijō-kan joined him in going there.

Other similarly honored Hachiman shrines were Usa Shrine of Usa in Ōita Prefecture and Hakozaki-gū of Fukuoka in Fukuoka Prefecture.

Imperial progresses to the shrine
In 979 (Tengen 2), Emperor Enyū visited the shrine; and the shrine continued to be visited by nearly all the emperors until the reign of Emperor Go-Daigo, when the sovereigns began to live more secluded lives.

In the Shōhei era (1346–1370), Emperor Murakami visited Iwashimizu in person.

After the Ōnin war (1467–1477), Imperial visits were held in abeyance for 200 years.

Shinto belief
The shrine is dedicated to the veneration of Hachiman, the Shinto kami or spirit guardian of Imperial legitimacy.  Since the time of its founding in 859, Hachiman has been recognized as Emperor Ojin.

Treasures
A 2005 survey of the treasures at Iwashimizu revealed, among other things, the existence of a kris, a jeweled Indonesian dagger, which was exhibited  at Kyoto National Museum as part of an exhibit entitled "Famous Swords from Kyoto's Temples and Shrines."

See also
 List of Shinto shrines
 Twenty-Two Shrines
 Modern system of ranked Shinto Shrines
 Minamoto no Yorinobu
 Minamoto no Yoriyoshi

Notes

References
 Breen, John and Mark Teeuwen. (2000).  Shinto in History: Ways of the Kami. Honolulu: University of Hawaii Press. ; ;  OCLC 43487317
 Brown, Delmer M. and Ichirō Ishida, eds. (1979).  Gukanshō: The Future and the Past. Berkeley: University of California Press. ;  OCLC 251325323
 Kanda, Christine Guth. (1985).  Shinzō: Hachiman Imagery and Its Development. Cambridge: Harvard University Press. 
 Ponsonby-Fane, Richard. (1959).  The Imperial House of Japan. Kyoto: Ponsonby Memorial Society. OCLC 194887
 . (1962).   Studies in Shinto and Shrines. Kyoto: Ponsonby Memorial Society. OCLC 399449
 . (1963).  Vicissitudes of Shinto. Kyoto: Ponsonby Memorial Society. OCLC 36655
 Maas, Jeffrey P. (1999).  Yoritomo and the Founding of the First Bakufu: The Origins of Dual Government in Japan. Stanford: Stanford University Press. 
 Titsingh, Isaac. (1834). Nihon Odai Ichiran; ou,  Annales des empereurs du Japon.  Paris: Royal Asiatic Society, Oriental Translation Fund of Great Britain and Ireland.  OCLC 5850691

External links

  Iwashimizu Hachimangū web site (in Japanese)
 Photos of Iwashimizu Hachimangū and references in ancient Japanese literature

Kanpei-taisha

Religious buildings and structures completed in 859
Shinto shrines in Kyoto Prefecture
Shinbutsu shūgō
Important Cultural Properties of Japan
Historic Sites of Japan
9th-century establishments in Japan
Hachiman shrines
 Beppyo shrines